Colin Christopher Paget Tennant, 3rd Baron Glenconner (1 December 1926 – 27 August 2010) was a British aristocrat. He was the son of Christopher Grey Tennant, 2nd Baron Glenconner, and Pamela Winefred Paget. He was also the nephew of Edward Tennant and Stephen Tennant, and the half-brother of the novelist Emma Tennant.

Before succeeding to the peerage in 1983, he had travelled widely, especially in India and the West Indies. He was an avid socialite and a close friend of Princess Margaret, to whom his wife, the former Lady Anne Coke, was a lady-in-waiting. In 1958, he purchased the island of Mustique in The Grenadines for £45,000.

Early life
Colin Tennant was born on 1 December 1926, the son of the second Baron Glenconner. His mother Pamela was the daughter of Sir Richard Paget, 2nd Baronet. After his parents divorced in 1935, he was educated at Scaitcliffe and Eton College; but, for years, Tennant rarely saw his father. Holidays from Eton were spent with his maternal grandmother, Muriel Paget, a formidable grande dame who had diverted a train from the Crimea to Siberia in World War I to save the lives of 70 British nannies.

After finishing his schooling at Eton, Tennant enlisted in the Irish Guards, serving during the tail end of World War II and attaining the rank of lieutenant.

After the war he went up to New College, Oxford. At Oxford, he gained a reputation for being "terribly kind to plain girls with nice manners and extremely waspish to pretty ones with nasty manners".

After graduating, he worked for the family's merchanting business, C. Tennant, Sons & Co, and at the same time, began to attract the attention of the gossip columns as Princess Margaret's escort. During the early 1950s, he was often involved in amateur dramatics; in 1953, he took part, with Princess Margaret, in a production for charity of an Edgar Wallace play, The Frog; Tennant played the title role (a serial killer) and the Princess was Assistant Stage Director.

It was during this period that Tennant was spotted as a possible husband for Princess Margaret, who had been publicly hurt by the collapse of her hopes of marrying the divorced commoner Group Captain Peter Townsend during 1953. During the following year, he was forced to deny newspaper reports that he would shortly announce his engagement to the Princess. "I don't expect she would have had me," he was quoted as saying, in later years. Princess Margaret met future husband Tony Armstrong-Jones, who was hired to take wedding pictures at Tennant's 1956 wedding to Lady Anne Coke.

Mustique island
After purchasing the Caribbean island of Mustique in 1958, Tennant built a new village for its inhabitants, planted coconut palms, vegetables, and fruit, and developed the fisheries.

In 1960, the British royal yacht Britannia carried Princess Margaret and her new husband, now Lord Snowdon, on a honeymoon cruise around the Caribbean. The royal couple visited Mustique to accept a wedding gift from Tennant, a plot of land on which the Princess was to build her holiday retreat, Les Jolies Eaux.

The cost of running Mustique depleted Glenconner's family fortune, and he was obliged to take on business partners. Eventually, he went into self-exile on St. Lucia, where, assisted by Iranian investors, he built and for many years ran the "Bang Between the Pitons" restaurant. After about three years, the restaurant, constructed as "an almost exact copy of Messel's stage set for the 1950s Broadway musical House of Flowers," went bankrupt. It was eventually resurrected by the Hilton chain of hotels as the Jalousie Bar, part of the Jalousie Resort.

Glenconner and his involvement in Mustique has been the subject of multiple documentaries. In 1971, he was interviewed by Alan Whicker for an episode of Whicker's World set on the island. In 2000, a documentary by Joseph Bullman was made, titled The Man Who Bought Mustique, that included Glenconner's first visit to Mustique since his exile. According to a reviewer, Tennant's "occasionally dictatorial manner" was "amply displayed" in the documentary. To describe Tennant, he wrote, "you had to imagine your most crotchety uncle on his worst day and magnify that tenfold."

Later life
In 1963, his father, the 2nd Baron Glenconner, sold the family business to Consolidated Gold Fields, and Tennant suddenly inherited £1 million. At first father and son were retained as chairman and deputy chairman, but after his father's retirement in 1967, Tennant failed to become chairman and resigned. Over the years the Tennants became significant landowners as well as industrialists. Part of their land was in the West Indies, including a neglected 15,000 acres in Trinidad.

Family and inheritance

On 21 April 1956, Tennant married Lady Anne Veronica Coke. Lady Anne is the daughter of Thomas Coke, 5th Earl of Leicester. Lady Anne had been one of Queen Elizabeth II's Maids of Honour at the 1953 coronation, and was also a close friend and lady-in-waiting of the Queen's sister, Princess Margaret.

Lord and Lady Glenconner had five children, three sons and twin daughters:
Hon. Charles Edward Pevensey Tennant (15 February 1957 – 19 October 1996). He married Sheilagh Scott in 1993.  He became a heroin addict and died of Hepatitis C. His son Cody Charles Edward Tennant (born 2 February 1994) became the 4th baron.
Hon. Henry Lovell Tennant (21 February 1960 – 2 January 1990; died of AIDS), married 1983 Teresa Cormack; their son, Euan Lovell Tennant (born 1983), is the current heir presumptive to the barony. Euan is married to Helen Tennant. They have 2 children together.
Hon. Christopher Cary Tennant (born 25 April 1968). He suffered severe brain damage in a motorcycle accident in 1987. He married Anastasia Papadakos in 1996. The couple later divorced. They have daughters Bella Tennant (b. 1997) and Demetria Tennant (b. 2000). Married secondly Johanna Lissack Hurn on 11 February 2011.
Hon. Flora May Pamela Tennant (born 8 November 1970), a god-daughter of Princess Margaret. She married 18 April 2005 Anton Ronald Noah Creasy. They have 2 daughters named Honor Rose and Greta Creasy.
Hon. Amy Jasmine Elizabeth Tennant (born 8 November 1970). No issue.

Colin Tennant inherited the peerage title and the Tennant baronetcy, along with the family's Scottish estate of The Glen, in 1983, on the death of his father. The couple came to divide their time between their house on St. Lucia and their home in England. Together with his daughter May and her husband Anton, Glenconner began to develop the Beau Estate property between the Pitons. As his eldest son, the Hon. Charles Edward Pevensey Tennant (1957–1996), predeceased him, Glenconner was succeeded by his grandson, Cody Charles Edward Tennant (born 2 February 1994).

In December 2009, Tennant, then aged 83, learned that he was also father to London psychotherapist Joshua Bowler. Bowler's mother, the artists' model and bohemian Henrietta Moraes, had become pregnant following a weekend spent with Tennant after the New Year's Eve 1954 Chelsea Arts Club Ball. However, she never told Tennant about the pregnancy, and married the actor Norman Bowler seven months later; the couple divorced two and a half years after that. After Moraes' death in 1999, Joshua Bowler decided to investigate his parentage and wrote to Tennant after a mutual friend recalled seeing the young Tennant and Moraes leave the 1954 ball together. A paternity test revealed that Tennant was indeed Bowler's father, news that Tennant looked upon as "quite magical." Tennant later announced his intention to recognise him in his will.

When Lord Glenconner died in 2010, it was revealed that he had made a new will shortly before his death leaving all of his assets to an employee, Kent Adonai. The family contested this will, and after a legal battle that lasted several years the estate was divided between Adonai and Cody Charles Edward Tennant, the fourth Lord Glenconner.

In popular culture
Colin Tennant is portrayed by Pip Carter and Richard Teverson in the Netflix television series The Crown.  Anne is played by Grace Stone and Nancy Carroll.
Colin is portrayed by Jonathan Hansler in the television film The Queen's Sister (2005).

In 2019, Lady Glenconner's memoir Lady in Waiting: My Extraordinary Life in the Shadow of the Crown, was published by Hodder & Stoughton. "I married all of my husband," she writes. "Colin could be charming, angry, endearing, hilariously funny, manipulative, vulnerable, intelligent, spoilt, insightful and fun."

Notes

External links
 
Cotton House Hotel on Mustique
Beau Estate
The Man Who Bought Mustique
The Mustique Company
Firefly Hotel on Mustique
St. Lucia Calling

2010 deaths
1926 births
People educated at Eton College
People educated at Scaitcliffe School
Barons in the Peerage of the United Kingdom
British socialites
Colin
Glenconner